Armistead Inge Selden Jr. (February 20, 1921 – November 14, 1985) was a segregationist U.S. Representative from Alabama.

Early life and military service
Born in Greensboro, Alabama, Selden attended the public schools. He graduated from Greensboro High School in 1938 and from the University of the South, Sewanee, Tennessee, in 1942. He served in the United States Navy from August 1942 until March 1946, with 31 months aboard ship, primarily in the North Atlantic, and was discharged as a lieutenant. He served as lieutenant commander in the United States Naval Reserve. He entered the University of Alabama School of Law and graduated in 1948.

He was admitted to the bar in 1948 and commenced practice in Greensboro, Alabama. He served as member of the Alabama House of Representatives in 1951 and 1952.

Congressional and diplomatic career
Selden was elected as a Democrat to the Eighty-third Congress. He was reelected to the seven succeeding Congresses (January 3, 1953 – January 3, 1969). While in Congress he was a signatory to the 1956 Southern Manifesto that opposed the desegregation of public schools ordered by the Supreme Court in Brown v. Board of Education. He served as a member of the United States House Committee on Foreign Affairs and as head of the now-defunct US House Inter-American Affairs Committee. Following the Cuban Revolution in 1958, led by Fidel Castro, Selden was influential in the passage of the October 19, 1960 United States embargo against Cuba and their expulsion from the Organization of American States on January 31, 1962. He also represented the US at the inauguration of Anastasio Somoza in 1967. He was not a candidate in 1968 for reelection to the United States House of Representatives but was an unsuccessful candidate for nomination to the United States Senate, losing the Democratic primary to former Lieutenant Governor James Allen. He resumed the practice of law until October 1970.

He served as Principal Deputy Assistant Secretary of Defense (International Security Affairs), October 1970 – February 1973, and as U.S. Ambassador to New Zealand, Fiji, The Kingdom of Tonga, and Western Samoa from 1974 to 1979. He was an unsuccessful Republican candidate for nomination in the United States Senate election in Alabama, 1980. He served as president of the American League for Exports and Security Assistance from 1980 to 1985. He was a resident of Greensboro, Alabama, and Falls Church, Virginia, until he died of cancer in Birmingham, Alabama, November 14, 1985. He was interred in Greensboro City Cemetery, Greensboro, Alabama.

A.I. Selden Dam, built in 1958 on Alabama's Black Warrior River, bears his name.

References
 Retrieved on 2009-03-02

Archives of Sewanee: The University of The South

External links

1921 births
1985 deaths
People from Greensboro, Alabama
Ambassadors of the United States to New Zealand
Democratic Party members of the Alabama House of Representatives
Sewanee: The University of the South alumni
United States Navy officers
United States Navy personnel of World War II
University of Alabama alumni
Democratic Party members of the United States House of Representatives from Alabama
20th-century American politicians
Ambassadors of the United States to Fiji
Ambassadors of the United States to Tonga
Alabama Republicans
20th-century American diplomats
American segregationists